Julia Bachope Goddard (11 July 1825 – 30 September 1896), was a British children's writer of more than 25 books, animal welfare campaigner, journalist and artist.

Early life
She was born in Birmingham on 11 July 1825, the eldest daughter in a family of ten children of Samuel Aspinwall Goddard (1796–1886) and his wife, Jemima Goddard, née Bachope (1800–1875). Samuel Aspinwall Goddard was born in Brookline, Massachusetts (a town 6 miles west of Boston), in the United States, and they were descendants of the ancient Goddard family of North Wiltshire. Her father moved to Birmingham in c.1820, where he was a gun manufacturer and iron merchant and exhibited at the 1851 The Great Exhibition. He also wrote pamphlets on free trade and currency reform and ran a multi-year writing campaign in The Birmingham Daily Post and The Times of London to try and convince the British public and parliament to side with the Union in the US Civil War. The family were very political, but neither Julia or Samuel ever ran for public office. He was the United States' consul in Birmingham, and later became a naturalized British subject.

Career
In 1863 Goddard published her first children's book, Karl and the Six Little Dwarfs, and at least a further twenty-five were published over the rest of her career.

Many of her books concentrated on animal welfare, itself mirroring her long-term commitment to helping animals receive more humane treatment, more "moderate humanitarianism", than the "more radical elements in the animal rights' movements or anti-vivisection". According to a contemporary account in the Animals' Friend, Goddard was "one of the hardest and yet most unpretentious workers the movement has yet possessed".

Personal life
She never married.

Later life
Goddard suffered from extremely poor health from 1894 onwards after a severe case of influenza, and together with her failing eyesight, she had to stop writing.

She was unmarried and lived with her sister, Fanny Delavan Goddard, in a cottage in Little Aston, near Sutton Coldfield, Warwickshire.  She died at her cottage as a result of a cerebral haemorrhage on 30 September 1896.

Selected publications

 Karl and the Six Little Dwarfs (1863)
 More Stories (1863)
 The Boy and the Constellations (1866)
 Wonderful Stories from Northern Lands (1871)
 The Golden Journey and Other Verses (1875)
 The Four Cats of the Tippertons and Other Stories About Animals (1881)
 New Boy At Merton
 The Search For The Gral
 The Search For The Gral
 Poems And Translations
 Heard At Last
 The Golden Weathercock
 Brave Dorette
 Mr. Lipcombe's Apples
 Fairy Tales Of Other Lands
 Joyce Dormers Story Vol 1
 Joyce Dormers Story Vol 2
 Thorns And Roses
 Pride Comes Before A Fall
 Song Book For Infants
 The Birds Nest and other Songs For Children
 Alison Brands Battle For Life
 John Gardiner's Neighbours
 Kasper And The Summer Fairies
 Titurel
 What Will She Do?

References

1825 births
1896 deaths
British animal welfare workers
British women children's writers
Writers from Birmingham, West Midlands